La Forêt may refer to:

Places

France
 La Forêt (Creuse), former commune of département Creuse today part of Montboucher
 La Forêt (Puy-de-Dôme), former commune of Puy-de-Dôme, today part of Cisternes-la-Forêt

La Forêt-Auvray, Orne
La Forêt-Fouesnant, Finistère
La Forêt-du-Parc, Eure
La Forêt-le-Roi, Essonne
La Forêt-Sainte-Croix, Essonne
La Forêt-sur-Sèvre, Deux-Sèvres
La Forêt-du-Temple, Creuse
La Forêt-de-Tessé, Charente

Guernsey
La Forêt, Guernsey (The Forest), a parish in Guernsey

Haiti
La Forêt, Grand'Anse

Arts 
 La Forêt (2014 film), a 2014 television film by Arnaud Desplechin adapted from the Russian play by Ostrovski
The Forest (TV series), 2017 French television series
La Forêt, 1987 opera by Rolf Liebermann

La Forêt (album) by Xiu Xiu

See also
 Laforêt (disambiguation)
 The Forest (disambiguation)